Rheborg is a surname of Swedish origin. Notable people with the surname include:

Johan Rheborg (born 1963), Swedish comedian, actor, and script writer
Rolf Rheborg (1922–1983), Swedish Navy rear admiral

Swedish-language surnames